Ecological civilization is the hypothetical concept that describes the alleged final goal of social and environmental reform within a given society. It implies that the changes required in response to global climate disruption and social injustices are so extensive as to require another form of human civilization, one based on ecological principles. Broadly construed, ecological civilization involves a synthesis of economic, educational, political, agricultural, and other societal reforms toward sustainability.  

Although the term was first coined in the 1980s, it did not see widespread use until 2007, when “ecological civilization” became an explicit goal of the Chinese Communist Party (CCP). In April 2014, the United Nations Alliance of Civilizations and the International Ecological Safety Collaborative Organization founded a sub-committee on ecological civilization. Proponents of ecological civilization agree with Pope Francis who writes, "We are faced not with two separate crises, one environmental and the other social, but rather with one complex crisis which is both social and environmental. Strategies for a solution demand an integrated approach to combating poverty, restoring dignity to the excluded, and at the same time protecting nature." As such, ecological civilization emphasizes the need for major environmental and social reforms that are both long-term and systemic in orientation.

History
In 1984, former Soviet Union environment experts proposed the term “Ecological Civilization” in an article entitled “Ways of Training Individual Ecological Civilization under Mature Socialist Conditions,” which was published in the Scientific Communism, Moscow, vol. 2.
 
Three years later, the concept of ecological civilization (Chinese: 生态文明; pinyin: shēngtài wénmíng) was picked up in China, and was first used by Qianji Ye (1909―2017), an agricultural economist, in 1987. Professor Ye defined ecological civilization by drawing from the ecological sciences and environmental philosophy.

The first time the phrase “ecological civilization” was used as a technical term in an English-language book was in 1995 by Roy Morrison in his book Ecological Democracy.

The term is found more extensively in Chinese discussions beginning in 2007. In 2012, the Chinese Communist Party (CCP) included the goal of achieving an ecological civilization in its constitution, and it also featured in its five-year plan. In the Chinese context, the term generally presupposes the framework of a “constructive postmodernism,” as opposed to an extension of modernist practices or a “deconstructive postmodernism,” which stems from the deconstruction of Jacques Derrida.

Both “ecological civilization” and “constructive postmodernism” have been associated with the process philosophy of Alfred North Whitehead. David Ray Griffin, a process philosopher and professor at Claremont School of Theology, first used the term “constructive postmodernism” in his 1989 book, Varieties of Postmodern Theology. A more secular theme that flowed out of Whitehead's process philosophy has been from the Australian environmental philosopher Arran Gare in his book called The Philosophical Foundations of Ecological Civilization: A Manifesto for the Future. 

The largest international conference held on the theme “ecological civilization” (Seizing an Alternative: Toward an Ecological Civilization) took place at Pomona College in June 2015, bringing together roughly 2,000 participants from around the world and featuring such leaders in the environmental movement as Bill McKibben, Vandana Shiva, John B. Cobb, Jr., Wes Jackson, and Sheri Liao. This was held in conjunction with the 9th International Forum on Ecological Civilization--an annual conference series in Claremont, CA established in 2006.

Out of the Seizing an Alternative conference, Philip Clayton and Wm. Andrew Schwartz co-founded the Institute for Ecological Civilization (EcoCiv), and co-authored the book What is Ecological Civilization: Crisis, Hope, and the Future of the Planet, which was published in 2019.

Since 2015, the Chinese discussion of ecological civilization is increasingly associated with an “organic” form of Marxism. “Organic Marxism” was first used by Philip Clayton and Justin Heinzekehr in their 2014 book, Organic Marxism: An Alternative to Capitalism and Ecological Catastrophe. The book, which was translated into Chinese and published by the People’s Press in 2015, describes ecological civilization as an orienting goal for the global ecological movement.

See also

Deep ecology
Ecological crisis
Ecological economics
Ecological modernization
Ecomodernism
Environmentalism
Environmental movement
Sustainability
Common heritage of humanity
Earth jurisprudence
Rights of nature
Scale (analytical tool)
Social metabolism
Anthropogenic metabolism

References

External links
United Nations Environment Programme Report: Green is Gold - the Strategy and Actions of China's Ecological Civilization 
Institute for Ecological Civilization
Institute for Postmodern Development of China
Pando Populus

Environmentalism
Environmental social science concepts
Environmental policy in China
Eco-socialism